Koulla Kakoulli (September 1961 – 2nd or 3 August 2018) was a British musician, dominatrix and bodybuilder. Born in Forest Hill in London, she died in Brighton in August 2018.

Background
As a musician, she sang, played keyboards and guitar. She was a backing musician for The Only Ones, and fronted her own band Lonesome No More. Her sister Zena Kakoulli was married to Peter Perrett, who managed both bands. Her brother Harry Kakoulli later became the bassist of the band Squeeze.

As a bodybuilder, she competed in the IBFA Ms. Universe Over 50 division, taking third place in the 2018 championships, and fourth place in the 2017 championship.

As a dominatrix, she used the name Mistress Dometria, and operated the Brighton Dungeon, a BDSM venue. Her work was the subject of The Boss Lady, a feature-length documentary by Stephanie De Palma.

In her private life, she was a mother of five, and had four grandchildren. At the time of her death, she was mourning the death of the father of three of her children.

She was found dead in the Brighton Dungeon on 3 August 2018, at the age of 56. Although traces of multiple drugs were found in her system, an inquest reached an open verdict. 
At the inquest into her death, the coroner described her thus: "Of the many people i’ve met, Koulla was one of the most amazing. Leading her life as she wanted to. Extraordinarily well organised with a huge number of people who loved her."

References

1960s births
2018 deaths
British rock singers
British rock guitarists
British rock keyboardists
British female bodybuilders
English dominatrices
British people of Greek Cypriot descent
People from Forest Hill, London